

Cricketers of Goan origin who have played Test cricket 

 Wallis Mathias for Pakistan in 1955
 Antao D'Souza for Pakistan in 1959
 Dilip Sardesai for India in 1961
 Paras Mhambrey for India in 1996

Cricketers of Goan origin who have played international cricket 

 Jack Britto for Malawi from 1954 onwards
 Alban Fernandes for Tanzania
 Armand "Chic" Saldanha for Tanzania (was the 12th man)
 Michael D'Sa for Uganda
 Peter D'Souza for East Africa
 Charlie D'Souza for East Africa
 Lawrence Fernandes for East Africa
  John "Chuck" Sequeira for Uganda
 Lawrence Barretto for Uganda
 Lawrence Dias for Uganda
 Blaise D'Cunha for Kenya
 Celly Dias for Uganda
 Edwin Fonseca for Uganda

Goan cricketers for India in age-group tournaments

 Saurabh Bandekar - India U-19
 Rahul Keni - India U-19

Goa Ranji Cricket Team 

Goa cricket team

References
 Cricinfo
 Sporty Goans
 Cricket Archive

Goa cricketers
Lists of people from Goa